The ARIA Music Award for Best International Artist, is an award presented at the annual ARIA Music Awards, which recognises the public performance of international artists in Australia. It was first handed in the 2010 ceremony under the name Most Popular International Artist.

The nominee pool for Best International Artist will be drawn from the ten highest selling artists, based on aggregated ARIA album and related single sales statistics for the charts published between the eligibility period.

Winners and nominees
In the following table, the winner is highlighted in a separate colour, and in boldface; other nominees are those that are not highlighted or in boldface.

References

External links

International Artist